The cycling competition at the 2010 Central American and Caribbean Games was held in Mayagüez, Puerto Rico.

The tournament was held from 21 to 29 July at the Ramey Air Force Base in Aguadilla.

Medal summary

Road events

BMX Events

Mountain events

Track events

References

External links

Events at the 2010 Central American and Caribbean Games
2010 in cycle racing
2010
2010 in track cycling
2010 in road cycling
2010 in BMX
2010 in mountain biking